Katja Ziliox (also Zillox; born 25 April 1970) is a retired German swimmer who won a bronze medal at the 1989 European Aquatics Championships. She also competed at the 1988 Summer Olympics in the 200 m backstroke, and 100 m and 4 × 100 m freestyle events and finished seventh in the relay.

References

1970 births
Living people
German female swimmers
Swimmers at the 1988 Summer Olympics
Olympic swimmers of West Germany
European Aquatics Championships medalists in swimming
Sportspeople from Siegen